Vanak is a village in Piveshk Rural District, Lirdaf District, Jask County, Hormozgan Province, Iran 450 km from Bandar Abbas (by car). At the 2006 census, its population was 414, in 85 families.

References 

Populated places in Jask County